Regional elections were held in Denmark on 6 March 1962.  11414 municipal council members were elected to the 1 April 1962 - 31 March 1966 term of office in more than 1,300 municipalities, as well as 301 members of the 25 counties of Denmark.

Results of regional elections
The results of the regional elections:

County Councils

Municipal Councils

References

1962
Denmark
Elections
Danish local elections